Andrew Dryden Blair (February 27, 1908 – December 27, 1977) was a Canadian professional hockey player who played for the Toronto Maple Leafs and the Chicago Black Hawks of the National Hockey League between 1928 and 1937.

Blair was born in Winnipeg, Manitoba, and was a graduate of the University of Manitoba.

Career statistics

Regular season and playoffs

Awards and achievements
 Allan Cup Championship (1928)
 1932 Stanley Cup Champion  (Toronto Maple Leafs)
 Played in NHL All-Star Game (1934)
 Honoured Member of the Manitoba Hockey Hall of Fame

External links

1908 births
1977 deaths
Canadian ice hockey centres
Chicago Blackhawks players
Manitoba Bisons ice hockey players
National Hockey League All-Stars
Ice hockey people from Winnipeg
Stanley Cup champions
Toronto Maple Leafs players
Winnipeg Hockey Club players